Steve Shapiro (born 1963) is an American music producer, session musician, and jazz vibraphonist.

Biography

Steve Shapiro is a veteran NYC studio vibraphonist, composer, and synth programmer. He has recorded or performed with artists such as  Steely Dan (Two Against Nature), Phil Collins, Whitney Houston, Ornette Coleman, Pat Martino, Regina Belle, Curtis Fuller, Jimmy Heath, They Might Be Giants, and Spyro Gyra. Shapiro is also an accomplished producer and arranger whose work has appeared in hundreds of television and film projects, and is a long-time producer/arranger for the Walt Disney Company and Pixar Animation Studios, with credits on an array of projects related to over forty feature film releases. He has been a pioneer of using audio and midi technology with the vibraphone since the 1980s, and has developed a unique voice inspired by contemporary electric keyboards. The industry journal MIX Magazine writes, "Steve Shapiro is a legitimate triple-threat musician."

Shapiro grew up in Connecticut, and graduated from Yale University in 1985 after studying with artists Steve Swallow, Dave Samuels, and Anthony Davis. He was an early proponent of music technology and midi synthesizers, appearing as a sound programmer on many New York City sessions in the late 1980s. Shapiro performed throughout the 1990s using the K&K midi vibraphone, which was also used by mallet players such as Mike Mainieri.

Shapiro has released seven contemporary jazz recordings as a leader, two with acclaimed Nashville guitarist Pat Bergeson. He is a Yamaha performing artist, and plays Mike Balter Signature mallets.

Recordings as leader
1. Xylophobia (Curious/Sons of Sound, 2002), with Pat Bergeson, Marc Johnson, Danny Gottlieb, Kevin Hays, Tim Ries, Mike Davis, Jim Hynes
2. Low Standards (Sons of Sound, 2005), with Pat Bergeson, Doug Weiss, Scott Kreitzer, Jeff Williams, Annie Sellick
3. Backward Compatible (Apria/Vibraphonic, 2008), with Pat Bergeson, Annie Sellick, Marc Johnson, Jochen Reuckert, and others
4. Vibe Out (Vibraphonic, 2013), re-release of 1996 and previous multitrack analog sessions
5. Solomental (Solidtone 2015), solo acoustic & electric vibraphone, and marimba
6. TRi/O: Try the Veal (Solidtone, 2020), with Dave Anderson (bass) & Tyger MacNeal (drums)
7. Plan To Be Spontaneous (Solidtone, 2022), with Jeff Coffin, Pat Bergeson, Oz Noy, Mark Egan, Shane Theriot, Bob Lanzetti, Joel Rosenblatt, Carter McLean, and guest Lucy Woodward.

Recordings as sideman (selected)

Steely Dan, Two Against Nature, Giant Records
SpyroGyra, Rites of Summer, MCA Records
Various Artists, Mickey Mouse Clubhouse, Walt Disney Records
Joe Pesci, Vincent LaGuardia Gambini Sings, Sony
Various Artists, Preacher's Wife Soundtrack, Walt Disney Records
Various Artists, Chicken Little Soundtrack, Walt Disney Records
Dave Samuels, Living Colors, MCA Records
Dave Valentin, Musical Portraits, GRP Records
Regina Belle, Special Part of Me, CBS Records
Chris Walker, First Time, Pendulum/Elektra
Dave Valentin, Red Sun, GRP Records
Chris Walker, Sincerely Yours, Pendulum/Elektra
Kiku Collins, Here With Me, Innova
Mary Gatchell, Indigo Rose
Rebecca Sayre, New Girl
Marica Hiraga, Mona Lisa, 3D Japan

See also
Vibraphone
List of vibraphonists

References

 "Arranging Contemporary Cover Songs for Vibraphone"; by Steve Shapiro; Percussive Notes, Percussive Arts Society, Fall 2020
 Included in: "Masters Of The Vibes"; by Anthony Smith; Marimba Productions / Perfect Paperbacks, 2017. https://www.amazon.com/Masters-Vibes-Anthony-Smith/dp/0999068504
 Steve Shapiro - What's on Your Playlist? Jazzed Magazine • February 2009 • February 6, 2009  https://www.jazzedmagazine.com/articles/whats-on-your-playlist/steve-shapiro/
 https://www.allmusic.com/album/low-standards-mw0000261386?1656254469196

External links

Sons of Sound Records

1963 births
Living people
American jazz vibraphonists
Musicians from Hartford, Connecticut
American male jazz composers
American jazz composers